Es Canar is a beach resort village on the Spanish island of Ibiza. The resort is in the municipality of Santa Eulària des Riu. The resort is reached along the street called Cami d'Escana from Santa Eulària des Riu. The resort is  along the coast, east of Santa Eulària des Riu. The journey time from the airport is approximately 40 minutes by taxi or tourist bus.

The resort
Es Canar is situated on the north eastern seaboard of the islands and as a consequence boasts a reputable sunrise, in contrast to the beautiful sunset found at San Antonio on the island's western side. The resort is compact and consists of mainly four and five storey hotels blocks with many restaurants and bars. The resort is heavily used by tourists during the summer months, and targeted at families. Within the resort there are several white sandy beaches. Also within the resort there is a bus station and pharmacy. From the bus station you are able to access the island other main resorts such as Santa Eulària des Riu, Ibiza Town, San Antoni and Portinatx with buses leaving for these destinations every 20 minutes. There are also many shops throughout the resort, selling branded merchandise, as well as other smaller stores selling authentic Ibizan items. At the southern end of the beach is a small harbour where you can catch a ferry to Santa Eulària des Riu, Ibiza Town, Formentera or one of the many small resorts on the south east coast of the island.

Environment
To the south of the resort is the wooded promontory of Punta Arabí, whilst west inland is a well watered plain. Just offshore from the beach there are the small islands sa Galera and Illa des Canar. In 2003 the beach at Es Canar was awarded a Blue Flag.

Fiestas
Every July the Spanish celebration of Saint Christopher happens in this resort, usually in the first week of July whereby a carnival procession passes through the resort, en route to Santa Eulària with the event culminating in an impressive fireworks display.

Hippy market
Every Wednesday, the Hippy Market takes place at Punta Arabí south of the resorts main center. In the 1960s during the hippy era, many Hippies settled on the Ibiza and began to eke out a living by making trinkets and gifts out of wood, metals and steels, thus the tradition of the markets on the island began, and are still going strong today.

Language
Eivissenc is the native dialect of Catalan that is spoken throughout all Ibizan towns and nearby Formentera, though Catalan also shares co-official status with Spanish." Additionally, because of the influence of tourism and expatriates living in or maintaining residences on the island,  other languages like English, German and Italian, are also spoken. Polylinguality is the norm, not the exception.

Climate

See also
 Platja Es Canar (The Beach)

References

External links
Official tourism site for Ibiza

Populated places in Ibiza
Seaside resorts in Spain